Armando Mário O. Vieira was a philatelist who, in 1984, was awarded the Crawford Medal by the Royal Philatelic Society London for his Selos classicos de relevo de Portugal. Viera was an expert in the classic embossed issues of Portugal.

Selected publications
Selos classicos de relevo de Portugal. Porto: Núcleo Filatélico do Ateneu Comercial, 1983.

References

Philatelists
Year of birth missing (living people)
Philately of Portugal
Possibly living people